The Elizabeth S. Lenna Hall is recital and rehearsal hall, located on the grounds of the Chautauqua Institution, in western New York.

Background

The facility was built and dedicated in 1993. It was the first major program facility to be built at the Chautauqua Institution in 65 years. The building was a gift to Chautauqua Institution from Reginald Lenna (le-nā'), a retired local industrialist, in honor of his wife.

Design

Chautauqua Institution had long needed a rehearsal facility for its world-class symphony orchestra, which is in residence during the summer season each year.  Also needed was a recital hall that could seat several hundred.  The result was a dual-purpose building that uses state of the art acoustic control to accommodate both functions.  A small hall works well for recitals, but sound can be overwhelming in a small hall when an orchestra performs.  Moveable automated draperies and sound-absorbing panels were included in the design of the 8,000-square foot hall to absorb and dampen sound and control reverberation. Tiers of seating collapse into the walls and into a pit in the floor for rapid conversion from recitals to symphony rehearsals.  The building has cedar exterior and blends well with the rural landscape of the location. It was designed by Assembly Places International of Philadelphia. Acoustical consultants were Klepper and Marshall and King of White Plains, New York.

Uses

The Elizabeth S. Lenna Hall is the rehearsal facility for the Chautauqua Symphony Orchestra and the Music School Festival Orchestra.  It is also a recital hall for chamber music, voice, and piano and hosts many events each season.  The facility can accommodate a recital audience of 500 with 30 performers or a 100-piece symphony orchestra in rehearsal with no audience.  In 1996, Bill Clinton used the facility to prepare for a televised presidential debate with his opponent, Bob Dole.

References

See also
 
 

Chautauqua Institution
Buildings and structures in Chautauqua County, New York
Theatres in New York (state)